Soane ʻAsi (born circa 1963) is a Tongan former rugby union player. He played as wing.

Career
ʻAsi's only cap for Tonga was during the 1987 Rugby World Cup match against Canada on 24 May 1987, in the McLean Park, Napier.

References

External links
Soane Asi international stats

1963 births
Living people
Tongan rugby union players
Rugby union wings
Tonga international rugby union players